The 2006–07 UCI Europe Tour was the third season of the UCI Europe Tour. The season began on 15 October 2006 with the Chrono des Nations and ended on 18 October 2007 with the Giro del Piemonte.

The points leader, based on the cumulative results of previous races, wears the UCI Europe Tour cycling jersey. Niko Eeckhout of Belgium was the defending champion of the 2005–06 UCI Europe Tour. Alessandro Bertolini of Italy was crowned as the 2006–07 UCI Europe Tour.

Throughout the season, points are awarded to the top finishers of stages within stage races and the final general classification standings of each of the stages races and one-day events. The quality and complexity of a race also determines how many points are awarded to the top finishers, the higher the UCI rating of a race, the more points are awarded.

The UCI ratings from highest to lowest are as follows:
 Multi-day events: 2.HC, 2.1 and 2.2
 One-day events: 1.HC, 1.1 and 1.2

Events

2006

2007

Final standings
There is a competition for the rider, team and country with the most points gained from winning or achieving a high place in the above races.

Individual classification

Team classification

Nation classification

Nation under-23 classification

External links
 

UCI Europe Tour

UCI
UCI